Sironj Assembly constituency (Hindi:सिरोंज विधान सभा निर्वाचन क्षेत्र) is one of the 230 Vidhan Sabha (Legislative Assembly) constituencies of Madhya Pradesh state in central India. This constituency came into existence in 1957, as one of the Vidhan Sabha constituencies of Madhya Pradesh state.

Overview

Sironj (constituency number 147) is one of the 5 Vidhan Sabha constituencies located in Vidisha district. This constituency presently covers some of the villages from Sironj tehsil with 190, and Lateri tehsil's 233 villages. It has total 228 polling booths.

Sironj is part of Sagar (Lok Sabha constituency) along with seven other Vidhan Sabha segments namely Sironj and Shamshabad in Vidisha district and Bina, Khurai, Surkhi, Naryoli and Sagar in Sagar district.

Members of Legislative Assembly

Election results

2013 results

References

Vidisha district
Assembly constituencies of Madhya Pradesh